Segeberg is a district in Schleswig-Holstein, Germany. It is bounded by (from the southwest and clockwise) the districts of Pinneberg, Steinburg and Rendsburg-Eckernförde, the city of Neumünster, the districts of Plön, Ostholstein and Stormarn, and the city state of Hamburg.

History

The history of the district is connected with the history of Holstein. In 1134 the castle of Segeberg was erected as a regional centre from where the reeve of Segeberg ruled. When Schleswig-Holstein became a Prussian province in 1865, the Prussian administration established the district of Segeberg.

Since then the district has considerably grown twice: In 1932 parts of the dissolved district of Bordesholm joined the district; and in 1970 the city of Norderstedt became part of the district.

Geography

The district of Segeberg consists of the agricultural plains between the cities of Neumünster and Hamburg. A southwestern portion of the hilly lakeland called "Holsteinische Schweiz" (Holsatian Switzerland) belongs to the district, as well as some northern suburbs of Hamburg.

Coat of arms
The coat of arms displays:
 four steeples forming a cross, commemorating the missionary activities of bishop Vizelin of Segeberg who Christianised Holstein in the early Middle Ages
 the heraldic nettle leaf of Holstein in the middle of the cross
 four green water lily leaves from the arms of Segeberg's reeves

Towns and municipalities

References

External links

 Official website (German)

 
Districts of Schleswig-Holstein